Wark Castle may refer to:

Wark on Tweed Castle, Northumberland
Wark in Tyndale Castle, Northumberland

See also
Wark (disambiguation), a Scots noun for a building